Udagi (also spelled as Oodagi) is a village in the Sedam taluk of Gulbarga district in the Indian state of Karnataka.

History
Udagi is famous for the 10th century Kalokeshwara temple located in the village.

See also
Manyakheta
Handaraki
Sedam
Gulbarga
Karnataka

References

Hindu temples in Kalaburagi district
Villages in Kalaburagi district